James J. Spavital (September 15, 1926 – March 7, 1993) was an American gridiron football player, coach and executive in six different professional football leagues.  He served as the head coach of the Winnipeg Blue Bombers of the Canadian Football League (CFL) from 1970 to 1973 and as head coach of the Chicago Fire of the World Football League (WFL) in 1974.  Spavital was the general manager of the CFL's Saskatchewan Roughriders from 1979 to 1982 and the Michigan Panthers of the United States Football League (USFL) in 1983.

Playing career
Spavital played for the All-America Football Conference's Los Angeles Dons in 1949 and the National Football League's Baltimore Colts during the 1950 season.  As a starter in 1950 he had 246 rushing yards and 238 receiving.  His 96-yard rush against the Green Bay Packers on November 5, 1950 is the fourth longest run from scrimmage in NFL history.  As an Airborne reservist, Spavital was called up in 1951 to serve in the Korean War. His reporting date prevented him from playing a full NFL season so he moved north of the border to play for the Winnipeg Blue Bombers of the Canadian Football League (CFL) enabling him to play a complete season prior to reporting for duty.  Wear and tear on his feet effectively ended his playing career. He was also drafted by the New York Giants in the first round of the 1951 NFL Draft after the Baltimore Colts folded.

Coaching career
In 1955, Spavital joined the Oklahoma State coaching staff under coach Cliff Speegle. In 1968 he joined the Saskatchewan Roughriders as an assistant. In 1970 he was hired by the Winnipeg Blue Bombers as head coach. In four seasons as Bombers head coach, he had a 23–39–2 record and two playoff appearances.

In 1974, Spavital was hired as head coach of the Chicago Fire of the World Football League.  The team finished 7–13 and folded after the season. In 1975 he joined the New York Jets,  coaching the offensive backfield.  The following season, he again coached the offensive backfield coach for San Francisco 49ers coach Monte Clark.

In 1977 Spavital returned to the CFL as an assistant coach with the Calgary Stampeders, rejoining a fellow assistant from Saskatchewan, Jack Gotta.  In 1981 he was hired as general manager of the Saskatchewan Roughriders.

Spavital left the Roughriders after the season to join the Michigan Panthers of the United States Football League (USFL).  In the league's first year, the Panthers won the USFL championship, defeating the Philadelphia Stars title game. On September 9, 1983 he resigned his post as Panthers GM.  In 1989 Spavital was hired by Bill Byrne and Hubie Byrne to help put together a new professional football league to begin play in the spring or summer of 1990.  Spavital was the director of football operations for the Professional Spring Football League (PSFL) for two years before plans for the league were abandoned.

Spavital's son, Steve, was the head football coach at Broken Arrow Senior High in Broken Arrow, Oklahoma. Spavital is also the grandfather of current Texas State head coach Jake Spavital and Texas State defensive coordinator Zac Spavital.

References

External links
 

1926 births
1993 deaths
20th-century American businesspeople
American football executives
American football fullbacks
American players of Canadian football
Canadian football fullbacks
Baltimore Colts (1947–1950) players
Calgary Stampeders coaches
Chicago Fire (WFL) coaches
Los Angeles Dons players
New York Jets coaches
Oklahoma State Cowboys football coaches
Oklahoma State Cowboys football players
San Francisco 49ers coaches
Saskatchewan Roughriders coaches
Saskatchewan Roughriders general managers
Winnipeg Blue Bombers coaches
Winnipeg Blue Bombers players
Sportspeople from Oklahoma City
Players of American football from Oklahoma